Jan Maria Florent Wouters (born 14 July 1964) is a Belgian academic. He is Jean Monnet Chair, and Professor of International Law and International Organizations  at KU Leuven, where he is also Director of its  Centre for Global Governance Studies and Institute for International Law.

Education
Wouters earned a Bachelor of Philosophy degree in 1984, and Lic. Juris in 1987, both at the University of Antwerp. In 1990 he obtained a Master of Laws at Yale Law School, and was visiting researcher at Harvard Law School (1990-1991). In 1996, he obtained a PhD in law at KU Leuven, with a doctoral thesis focused on the freedom of establishment of business enterprises within the European Union.

Career
Wouters teaches public international law, international organizations, the law of the World Trade Organization and humanitarian and security law at KU Leuven. He is a visiting professor at the College of Europe (Bruges), SciencesPo (Paris) and LUISS University (Rome), where he teaches on the law of EU external relations. He also teaches in the Master of Laws in International Economic Law (IELPO) at the University of Barcelona and in the European Master's in Human Rights and Democratisation (EMA, EIUC, Venice). He was Référendaire at the European Court of Justice (1991-1994). In addition, he   practises law at Linklaters, Brussels.

Honours and distinctions

 Member, Advisory Board, Centre for Multilevel Federalism, Delhi, India, since January 2015
 Senior Visiting Fellow, the Graduate Institute, Geneva, Spring 2014
 International Chair, Luiss University, Rome, Spring 2014
 Visiting Professor, Université Nice Sophia Antipolis, Spring 2014
 Senior Visiting Fellow, Institute of Advanced Studies, University of Bologna, 2013
 Visiting Professor, Faculty of Law, Pontificia Universidad Católica de Chile
 Senior Visiting Fellow, European Union Institute for Security Studies, Paris, 2012
 Fellow, Netherlands Institute for Advanced Study in the Humanities and Social Sciences (NIAS), 2010
 Honorary President, United Nations Association Flanders – Belgium (Vereniging voor de Verenigde Naties), since June 2009 (President from 2003 to 2009 and since 2013)
 Jean Monnet Chair ad personam European Union and Global Governance granted by European Commission (2009)
 Member of the Royal Flemish Academy of Belgium for Sciences and Arts (since 2008)
 Fernand Braudel Fellow, European University Institute, 2008
 Honorary Member, Association of International Relations (“Kring Internationale Betrekkingen”, Leuven), since 2002
 Stibbe Prize, 1997
 Walter Leën Prize for Social Law, 1996
 Rotary Foundation Fellow, 1990–91
 Francqui Fellow, Belgian American Educational Foundation, 1989–90

Publications
 China, the EU and the Developing World (2015)
 The Law of EU External Relations (2013)
 National Human Rights Institutions in Europe (2013)
 The EU's Role in Global Governance (2013)
 China, the European Union and Global Governance (2012)
 Private Standards and Global Governance (2012)
 Informal International Lawmaking (2012)
 International Prosecutors (2012)
 The European Union and Multilateral Governance (2012)
 Upgrading the EU's Role as Global Actor (2011)
 Accountability for Human Rights Violations by International Organizations (2010)
 Belgium in the Security Council (2009)
 European Constitutionalism Beyond Lisbon (2009)
 The Europeanisation of International Law (2008)
 Multilevel Regulation and the EU (2008)
 The World Trade Organization. A Legal and Institutional Analysis (2007)
 The United Nations and the European Union (2006)
 Legal Instruments in the Fight Against International Terrorism (2004)

In addition, he is Editor of the International Encyclopedia of Intergovernmental Organizations, and Deputy Director of the Revue Belge de Droit International.

References

External links
 https://twitter.com/JMFWouters 
 http://www.globalgovernancestudies.eu
 http://www.internationallaw.eu
 http://www.vvn.be
 https://web.archive.org/web/20140923160301/http://ghum.kuleuven.be/ggs/about-us/people/wouters_jan.html

Living people
Belgian legal scholars
Academic staff of KU Leuven
1964 births
Fernand Braudel Fellows